Theridion pennsylvanicum is a spider in the family Theridiidae ("cobweb spiders"), in the infraorder Araneomorphae ("true spiders").
The distribution range of Theridion pennsylvanicum includes the USA and Canada.

References

External links
NCBI Taxonomy Browser, Theridion pennsylvanicum

Theridiidae
Spiders described in 1913